Guido Koçer (born 15 September 1988) is a Turkish professional footballer who plays as a winger for German club Greifswalder FC.

Club career
Koçer began his career with SV Seckach but joined in 2000  after two years TuS Neuhausen. Koçer played three years on youth side for TuS Neuhausen, before he was scouted from Hansa Rostock in 2003. Koçer played four years for Hansa Rostock in the youth and was promoted to the 2. Bundesliga team in summer 2008. He was fired and released from his contract with Hansa Rostock on 19 March 2009. On 29 April 2009, he had a trial at Rot-Weiß Oberhausen. Koçer was then a short time free agent and was on 2 August 2009 signed by SV Babelsberg 03 on a-one year contract. Two years later he signed for Erzgebirge Aue.

International career
Koçer has played for Turkey U21. He made his debut on 10 February 2009 against the Ukraine U21.

References

External links
  
 
 
 

1988 births
German people of  Turkish descent
People from Worms, Germany
Footballers from Rhineland-Palatinate
Living people
Turkish footballers
Turkey under-21 international footballers
German footballers
Association football wingers
Association football midfielders
FC Hansa Rostock players
SV Babelsberg 03 players
FC Erzgebirge Aue players
Gençlerbirliği S.K. footballers
Yeni Malatyaspor footballers
Giresunspor footballers
Boluspor footballers
Samsunspor footballers
Bandırmaspor footballers
Regionalliga players
2. Bundesliga players
Oberliga (football) players
3. Liga players
Süper Lig players
TFF First League players
TFF Second League players